Mount Wilbur is a high peak of the Fairweather Range, the southernmost part of the Saint Elias Mountains. It lies approximately 14 miles (22 km) southeast of Mount Fairweather and 8 miles (13 km) northwest of Mount Crillon. It is included in Glacier Bay National Park. The peak is the higher of a pair of peaks, Mounts Wilbur and Orville, named after the Wright Brothers.

Though not a particularly high peak in absolute terms, Mount Wilbur does stand quite high above local terrain, due to its proximity to the ocean: the summit is only 7.5 miles from tidewater at the head of Lituya Bay to the southwest.

References

External links
 Mount Wilbur on Topozone
 Mount Wilbur on bivouac.com

Landforms of Hoonah–Angoon Census Area, Alaska
Mountains of Alaska
Saint Elias Mountains
Wright brothers
Mountains of Unorganized Borough, Alaska
Mountains of Glacier Bay National Park and Preserve